Kulapat Yantrasast (born in Bangkok) is a practitioner in the fields of architecture, art, and design. Originally from Thailand and now based in Los Angeles, he is the founding partner and Creative Director of wHY, a multidisciplinary design practice. In 2007 Yantrasast led the design for the Grand Rapids Art Museum, the first art museum building in the world to receive the LEED Gold certification for environmentally sustainable design. As Creative Director of wHY, Yantrasast is known as a leading architect for the art world, and he has made a number of public speaking appearances discussing creativity, food, architecture, and human flourishing.

Background
Yantrasast was born in Bangkok, Thailand, where he graduated with honors from Chulalongkorn University. He received his M.Arch. and Ph.D. degrees in Architecture from the University of Tokyo, under a Japanese Government scholarship.

He is currently on the Board of Trustees of the Pulitzer Arts Foundation and the Noguchi Museum, and he is part of the Artists Council for the Hammer Museum at UCLA. Yantrasast has served on the Artists’ Committee of the Americans for the Arts since 2005, the nation’s oldest organization for support of the arts in the society.

Professional career

From 1996 to 2003, Yantrasast worked as a close associate of the world-renowned Japanese architect Tadao Ando, responsible for international projects including the Modern Art Museum of Fort Worth in Fort Worth, Texas (2002), Armani / Teatro in Milan, Italy (2001), Fondation Francois Pinault pour l’Art Contemporain in Paris, France (2001–2003), the Calder Museum project in Philadelphia, PA, (1999–2002) and the Clark Art Institute in Williamstown, MA (2001-2014) as well as international design competitions.

Yantrasast founded wHY Architecture in 2003, later shortened to wHY.  The studio's first major commission was the completion of the Grand Rapids Art Museum (2007) in Michigan. wHY has since worked on a number of important museum projects, including the expansion of the Speed Art Museum in Louisville, KT, and gallery design and planning for Harvard Art Museums and the Art Institute of Chicago.

The practice is currently engaged in major gallery renovation projects including the Rockefeller Wing of the Metropolitan Museum of Art and the Northwest Coast Hall at the American Museum of Natural History. Other leading cultural projects include a new contemporary art museum in Makati, Philippines, and the Tchaikovsky Academic Opera and Ballet Theater in Perm, Russia.

Yantrasast has also designed a number of private residences, including large scale homes in Malibu, Venice Beach, and Beverly Hills, CA, and villas in Chiang Mai and Phuket in Thailand.

Each of these projects follow Yantrasast's guiding ethic of human centered design and creative collaboration, and wHY's interdisciplinary workshop is engaged in a number of significant community engagement projects and urban masterplans. The practice has been working with a consortium of civic leaders, private developers, and urban planners to revitalize the historic Portland Warehouse District adjacent to Louisville, Kentucky. In 2017 and 2018 respectively, the wHY Landscape Workshop won two international competitions to design large-scale urban parks: West Princes Street Gardens and the Ross Pavilion in Edinburgh, Scotland, and Rees Ridge Waterfront Park in Toronto, Canada. Yantrasast is also involved in important community projects in California, including a mixed use affordable housing compound in Watts, Los Angeles and EPACENTER Arts, a youth arts and music center in East Palo Alto.

Awards and recognition 
In 2009, Yantrasast received the Silpathorn Award for Design from Thailand's Ministry of Culture for outstanding achievement and notable contributions to Thai contemporary arts and culture. He was the first architect to receive the prestigious award.

Yantrasast was named of the 100 Most Powerful People in the Art World by Art+Auction magazine in their 2012 Power 100 issue.

In 2020, Architectural Digest listed wHY on AD100, their annual survey of the top names in interior decoration, architecture, and landscape design.

Selected Clips 

Architecture between Why and Why Not Strelka Institute Future Architect Conference
In Residence: Kulapat Yantrasast NOWNESS
Feast of Clarity: Food + Architecture Glass House
AD Interviews: Kulapat Yantrasast ArchDaily

Selected Press 

2020 AD 100 Debut: wHY Architecture Architectural Digest
 The Architect Kulapat Yantrasast Loves ‘Making Good Spaces’, The New York Times 
Kulapat Yantrasast, Interview by Eva Munz Pin-Up Magazine No.17
Architect Kulapat Yantrasast is the Art World's Newest Darling DEPARTURES
After Learning From a Master, Kulapat Yantrasast Builds and Renovates Museums Around the World Architectural Digest
Guess Co-Founder Maurice Marciano is Opening LA’s Newest Museum Wall Street Journal Magazine
Creative Types From Manolo Blahnik to Milton Glaser on Their Favorite Writing and Drawing Instruments New York Times Magazine

Notable works 

 Asian Art Museum of San Francisco (2018)
 American Museum of Natural History Northwest Coast Hall (2017)
 Marciano Art Foundation (2017) 
 David Kordansky Gallery (2014)
 L&M Arts Gallery  (2010)
 Galleries at the Art Institute of Chicago (2007)
 Studio Art Hall, Pomona College (2014)
 Galleries at the Harvard Art Museum (2015)
 Walkway at the Worcester Art Museum (2015)
 Interpretative Green Bridge at the Los Angeles River

References

External links 
 wHY website

Living people
Kulapat Yantrasast
University of Tokyo alumni
Kulapat Yantrasast
Kulapat Yantrasast
Year of birth missing (living people)